Logar may refer to:

Geography
 Logar Province, Afghanistan
 Logar River in Afghanistan
 Logar Valley (Slovenia)

People
 Eva Logar (born 1991), Slovenian ski jumper
 Lojze Logar (1944–2014), Slovenian artist
 Mihovil Logar (1902–1998), Slovenian composer
 Tine Logar (1916–2002), Slovenian linguist

See also

Lotar (disambiguation)